Enchelycore nycturanus is a moray eel found in the Aliwal Shoal off the coast of South Africa. It was first named by D.G. Smith in 2002.

References

nycturanus
Fish described in 2002